Agwara (or Agwarra) is a Local Government Area in Niger State, Nigeria. Its headquarters are in the town of Agwara.

It has an area of 1,538 km and a population of 57,413 at the 2006 census.

The postal code of the area is 923.

References
2.

By Bello Usman Gidi
By Lukman Umar Atako

Local Government Areas in Niger State